Paramordellaria ivoirensis is a species of beetle in the family Mordellidae, the only species in the genus Paramordellaria. It is known from the Ivory Coast.

References

Endemic fauna of Ivory Coast
Mordellidae
Beetles described in 1968